This is a list of destinations served by Qazaq Air. The table below provides each country served along with the destinations the airline flies to, as well as the name of the airports served. Terminated destinations are also listed.

As of March 2020, Qazaq Air serves 11 destinations.

List

References

Qazaq Air